The Old Bed of Waipawa River is a river of the Hawke's Bay region of New Zealand's North Island. It flows roughly parallel with and north of the Waipawa River, which it almost meets to the east of Waipawa. It flows into the Tukituki River via the Papanui Stream, south west of Lake Poukawa. The Waipawa changed its course during a flood in 1868. In the Cyclone Gabrielle event of February 2023 the flooded river broke its banks south of Waipapa town and reverted to its old bed, causing significant damage to farms and property. The Coronation Park stop bank in Waipawa was repaired on 16 February, returning the Waipawa to its post 1868 course.

See also
List of rivers of New Zealand

References

 

Rivers of the Hawke's Bay Region
Rivers of New Zealand